(born 31 January 1947) is a Japanese pianist and composer, who works in both jazz and art-music idioms.

Early life
Kako was born in Osaka. He began playing piano at eight years old and learned to play jazz while in his teens.

Later life and career
He attended the Tokyo University of Fine Arts and Music, receiving both his bachelor's (1965-1969) and master's in composition (1971) there. Upon graduating, he matriculated at the Paris Conservatoire, where he studied composition under Olivier Messiaen; concurrently, he played jazz in clubs, beginning a long-term association with Kent Carter and Oliver Johnson as a trio. He played with Noah Howard, Masahiko Togashi, and Steve Lacy in the 1970s, and with Togashi again as a duo in the early 1980s. Starting in the mid-1980s, he increasingly moved toward playing solo piano, although he occasionally toured with ensembles as well.

In addition to his performance career, Kako has worked extensively as a composer. He has written scores for traditional ensembles and for film and television, including the 1998 film The Quarry.

Discography

As Emergency
(with Bob Reid, Boulou Ferré, Glenn Spearman, Sabu Toyozumi)
 Homage to Peace (America, 1973) - Recorded in 1972

As leader/co-leader
  with Mototeru Takagi (Nadja, 1974) - live
  (Trio, 1976)
  (Trio, 1976)
  (Trio, 1977) - recorded in 1976
 Night Music (Sun, 1977) - recorded in 1974
  (Trio, 1977) - live
 TOK with Oliver Johnson, Kent Carter (Trio, 1978)
 El Al with Toshiyuki Miyama and his New Herd (Union, 1979)
 Valencia with Masahiko Togashi (Trio, 1980)
  (Baybridge, 1984)
 Twilight Monologues with Masahiko Sato, Aki Takase, Ichiko Hashimoto (Lunatic, 1984)
 Solo Concert (Insights, 1985)
 Poesie (CBS/Sony, 1986)
  (CBS/Sony, 1986)
 Scrawl (CBS/Sony, 1987)
 Kenji (CBS/Sony, 1988)
  (CBS/Sony, 1989)
  (CBS/Sony, 1990)
 Estampe Sonore (CBS/Sony, 1991)
  (Sony/Epic, 1992)
  (Sony/Epic, 1992)
  (TriStar Music, 1993)
  (Epic/Sony, 1996)
  (Sony/Epic, 1998)
  (Sony, 1999)
  (Sony, 2004)
  (Avex Classics, 2006)
  (Avex-Classics, 2007)
 Qualtet (Avex Classics, 2010)
  with Mototeru Takagi, Sabu Toyozumi (Kaitai, 2012)
  with Mototeru Takagi, Sabu Toyozumi (Kaitai, 2012)

Soundtracks
 NHK Special  Original Soundtrack (Escalier, 1995; Excerpt on YouTube)
 Original Soundtrack From The Motion Picture  (Sony Music Media, 1998)
  Original Soundtrack (Toho, 2001)
  Original Soundtrack (Toho, 2002)
  Original Soundtrack (Fuji TV, 2004)
  Original Soundtrack (Avex Trax, 2008)

References

Kazunori Sugiyama, "Takashi Kako". The New Grove Dictionary of Jazz''. 2nd edn, ed. Barry Kernfeld.

1947 births
21st-century Japanese male musicians
21st-century Japanese pianists
Japanese jazz composers
Japanese jazz pianists
Japanese male pianists
Living people
Male jazz composers
Male jazz pianists
Tokyo University of the Arts alumni